is a private university in Hakodate, Hokkaido, Japan, established in 1965. The predecessor of the school was founded in 1938. The Faculty of Commerce is the university's only faculty, and consists of three courses: Business Management, Market Creation, and International English. The university has sister schools in Australia, the United States, England, South Korea, and China.

References

External links
 Official website 

Educational institutions established in 1938
Private universities and colleges in Japan
Universities and colleges in Hokkaido
1938 establishments in Japan